Orthogonius rhodesiensis is a species of ground beetle in the subfamily Orthogoniinae. It was described by Lorenz in 1998.

References

rhodesiensis
Beetles described in 1998